In mathematics, the van der Corput inequality is a corollary of the Cauchy–Schwarz inequality that is useful in the study of correlations among vectors, and hence random variables. It is also useful in the study of equidistributed sequences, for example in the Weyl equidistribution estimate. Loosely stated, the van der Corput inequality asserts that if a unit vector  in an inner product space  is strongly correlated with many unit vectors , then many of the pairs  must be strongly correlated with each other. (More generally, if the vectors involved are not unit vectors, then strong correlation means that .)

Statement of the inequality

Let  be a real or complex inner product space with inner product  and induced norm .  Suppose that  and that .  Then

In terms of the correlation heuristic mentioned above, if  is strongly correlated with many unit vectors , then the left-hand side of the inequality will be large, which then forces a significant proportion of the vectors  to be strongly correlated with one another.

Proof of the inequality
Then,

 since the inner product is bilinear
 by the Cauchy–Schwarz inequality
 by the definition of the induced norm
 since  is a unit vector and the inner product is bilinear
 since  for all .

External links

 A blog post by Terence Tao on correlation transitivity, including the van der Corput inequality 

Inequalities
Diophantine approximation